Kerry Turner (born October 16, 1960) is an American composer and horn player. Turner is a recognized name in the horn and brass industry. Turner’s major ensembles with whom he performs include the American Horn Quartet, the Virtuoso Horn Duo,  and the Luxembourg Philharmonic Orchestra. Turner has performed internationally as a soloist and clinician. Turner also sings tenor in a semi-professional octet.

Life 

At age 11, Kerry Turner won the San Antonio Music Society Composition Competition. At 17, he was awarded a scholarship to attend Baylor University after winning the Baylor composition contest. Turner transferred to the Manhattan School of Music and received a Fulbright scholarship to study with Hermann Baumann at the Stuttgart College of Music and Performing Arts upon graduation. He placed fifth at the Geneva International Horn Competition and won the Bronze Medal at the 39th Prague Spring International Music Competition. In 1983, Turner assumed the position of principal horn of the Gürzenich Orchester, Cologne. In 1985, Turner joined the Radio-Tele-Luxembourg Symphony Orchestra and the American Horn Quartet.

Turner's compositions have been commissioned by many organizations, including the United States Air Force Heritage of America Band, the Luxembourg Philharmonic, the Japanese Horn Ensemble, and the Richmond, Virginia Chamber Music Society. His works have been awarded top prizes at the International Horn Society Composition Contest and the IBLA Foundation.
Turner received the Meir Rimon Commissioning Assistance Fund from the International Horn Society in 1993 to compose Six Lives of Jack McBride for horn, violin, tenor voice, and piano and again in 2004 to compose Scorpion in the Sand for horn, cello, and piano.

Turner's Quartet Nr. 1 won first prize in the International Horn Society's composition contest. Quartet Nr. 3 was awarded a prize in the International Horn Society composition contest in 1996. The Freden International Music Festival in Germany commissioned Turner to compose a brass quintet titled Ricochet, which become one of Turner's most successful works.

Several notable commissions include the U.S. Air Force "Heritage of America" band (Postcards from Lucca), the Alexander Horn Ensemble Japan (Ghosts of Dublin), the Brass Ensemble of the Symphony Orchestra of Lyon (The Heros), the Luxembourg Chamber Orchestra (The Celestials of Sago Lane), Palisades Virtuosi (Vathek), the Detroit Symphony Orchestra (Concerto for Horn and Orchestra "The Gothic"), and the horn sections of the Houston and Dallas symphonies (The Bronze Triptych).
Turner's music, which contains elements of folk music from the British Isles, a Mexican influence combined with his own western American style, and the sounds of North Africa and the Arab world, has been performed and recorded by chamber ensembles from the New York Philharmonic, The Berlin Philharmonic, the Vienna Philharmonic, and the Chicago Symphony, among others.

Turner has been a guest lecturer in composition at several institutions of music, including the Royal Academy of Oslo, the Academy of Fine Arts in Hong Kong, the Nero House of Music in Osaka, Japan, West Virginia University and the Winterthur Hochschule für Musik in Switzerland.

Works

Large ensembles 

 Karankawa - Symphony orchestra
 Concerto for Low Horn & Chamber Orchestra - Horn, chamber orchestra
 Les Heroes - Large brass ensemble, percussion
 Concerto for Brass Trombone (or Tuba) & Orchestra - Brass trombone (or tuba), orchestra
 The Labyrinth - Brass ensemble, percussion
 Postcards from Lucca - Wind ensemble
 Sonata for Horn & Strings - Horn, string quartet or string orchestra
 Symphony Nr. 1 - Symphony orchestra with chorus
 Symphony Nr. 2 - Chamber orchestra
 Celestials of Sago Lane - Chamber orchestra, 2 percussion soloists
 Karankawa - Symphony orchestra, or symphonic band, or wind ensemble
 Concerto for Brass Trombone - Brass trombone or bass tuba, orchestra
 Introduction & Main Event - Horn quartet, symphony orchestra, wind ensemble
 ’Twas a Dark and Stormy Night - Version for 2 horns, string orchestra

Chamber works 

 Ricochet - Brass quintet
 Quartet Nr. 3 for Horns - Horn quartet
 Casbah of Tetouan - Brass quintet
 Fiesta Fanfare - 4 trumpets or 4 horns
 Sonata for Horn & Piano - Horn, piano
 ’Twas a Dark and Stormy Night - Horn, organ (piano)
 Quartet Nr. 2 for Horns - Horn quartet
 Bandera - Trumpet, horn, trombone, piano
 Variations on a Luxembourgish Folk Song - Horn quartet
 Fanfare for Barcs - Horn quartet
 Quartet Nr. 1 for Horns - Horn quartet
 The Black Knight - Brass quintet, organ
 Soundings on the Erie Canal - Brass quintet
 Sonatina for Tuba & Piano - Tuba, piano
 Casbah of Tetouan - 5 horns
 Six Lives of Jack McBride - Tenor voice, horn, violin, piano
 Unlikely Fusion: Prologue & Epilogue for Four Horns, Tuba, Harpsichord, & Fiddle - 4 horns, tuba, harpsichord, fiddle
 Ghost Riders - 2 trumpets, 2 horns, 2 trombones, bass trombone, tuba, (optional tenor voice)
 The Pocono Menagerie - trumpet, horn, tuba/euphonium, piano
 Chaconne for Three Horns - 3 horns
 Song of Mary for Eight Voices - 8 voices (SSAATTBB)
 Quarter-After-Four - Horn, violin, piano
 The Seduction - String quartet
 Vathek - Flute, clarinet, piano
 The Ballad to Annabel Lee - Trumpet, piano
 Wedding Music - 4 horns, narrator
 Fandango - 4 horns
 Quartet Nr. 4 for Horns - 4 horns
 Improvisation - Brass quintet
 Sonatina for Violoncello or tuba, piano - Violoncello (or tuba), piano
 Suite for Solo Tuba & Horn Quartet - 4 horns, tuba
 Barbara Allen - 4 horns or 8 horns
 The Ghosts of Dublin - 8 horns
 Rhapsody - Woodwind quintet, violin, viola, violoncello, double bass
 The New-Found Journal - 4 tubas or woodwind quartet (flute, clarinet, horn, bassoon)
 Four Duets - 2 horns or 2 tubas
 Rule Britannia! - 4 horns
 Take 9 Fanfare - 9 horns
 Three Movements for Hour Horns - 4 horns
 Symphony for Carols - 8 horns, including 2 alphorns (optional)
 Farewell to Red Castle - 8 horns
 The New-Found Journal - Flute, clarinet, horn, bassoon
 ’Twas a Dark and Stromy Night - Version for 2 horns, organ or piano
 Cortejo - Brass quintet
 Kaitsenko - Brass quintet
 The Scorpion in the Sand - Violoncello, horn, piano
 Bronze Triptych - 12 horns, timpani, percussion
 Scorpion in the Sand - Violoncello, horn, piano
 Berceuse for the Mary Rose - Woodwind Quintet (flute, oboe, clarinet, horn, bassoon)
 Navajo Mandala - Combined woodwind, brass quintet with percussion

Solo works 

 Three Portraits - Solo horn
 Characters - Solo horn
 Come Thou Font of Every Blessing - Solo piano
 The Testament of Saladin - Solo horn
 Echoes of Glastonbury - Solo horn
 La Entrada de los Caballeros - Solo horn
 La Viuda de Salamanca - Solo horn
 Phantom Shanties - Solo horn
 Nine Pieces for Solo Horn - Solo horn
 Caprice - Solo horn
 The Twelve-Tone Waltz - Solo horn
 Crossing Union Square - Solo horn
 The Hunt of the Cheetah - Solo horn

References

External links 

 

1960 births
Living people
American male composers
21st-century American composers
American horn players
21st-century American male musicians